Combined Campuses and Colleges (CCC) is a List A cricket team and former first-class cricket team that plays in the West Indies domestic competition the Regional Super50 (formerly KFC Cup) and used to play in the Regional Four Day Competition (formerly Carib Beer Cup). Effectively a continuation of the previous University of the West Indies cricket team, the team was created for the 2007/08 season and played their first matches in the KFC Cup one-day competition in October 2007.

CCC made their four-day debut in the Carib Beer Cup in January 2008, they finished their maiden season with one win from six matches, finishing bottom of the league. In their second season of the four-day competition they improved, winning four out of 12 matches and finishing on an equal number of points with Barbados.

In 2011, CCC had a good first-class season in which they reached the final along with Jamaica. It was CCC's best performance thus far in the competition. They progressed to the final by posting victories against Barbados, the Leeward Islands, the Windward Islands and Guyana. However, CCC were no match for a strong Jamaica team, who won easily. In the 2012 Caribbean 4-day competition, CCC kicked off in style by beating the Leeward Islands by an innings and 15 runs.

In July 2014, the WICB announced that the CCC cricket team was to be excluded from the upcoming 2014-15 Regional Four Day competition as part of a series of changes adopted based on the recommendations made in a report presented by Richard Pybus, WICB's director of cricket, in March 2014.

In 2017 a similar team by nature (with some of the same players) as the CCC, called the Combined Universities and Campuses (CUC) made its debut in Jamaica's new premier two-day domestic cricket competition, the Jamaica Cricket Association Super League.

In October 2018, they beat Trinidad and Tobago in the final of the 2018–19 Regional Super50 to win their first title in the competition.

References

West Indian first-class cricket teams